The Valur women's handball team, commonly known as Valur, is the women's handball department of the Knattspyrnufélagið Valur multi-sport club. It has won the Icelandic championship 17 times.

History
In 2019, Valur won the Icelandic Cup for the 7th time and the national championship for the 17th time, the later after beating Fram in the Úrvalsdeild finals 3-0.

Titles 
 Úrvalsdeild kvenna
 Winner (17) : 1962, 1964, 1965, 1966, 1967, 1968, 1969, 1971, 1972, 1973, 1975, 1983, 2010, 2011, 2012, 2014, 2019
 Icelandic Women's Handball Cup
 Winner (7) : 1988, 1993, 2000, 2012, 2013, 2014, 2019

European record

Team

Current squad
Squad for the 2022-23 season

Goalkeepers
 3  Sara Helgadóttir
 12  Hrafnhildur Þorleifsdóttir
 14  Saga Sif Gísládóttir
Wingers
RW
 5  Karlotta Kjerulf Oskarsdóttir
 19  Audur Ester Gestsdóttir
LW
 2  Sigriður Hauksdóttir
 9  Lilja Ágústsdóttir
 11  Hanna Ólafsdóttir
 21  Berglind Gunnarsdóttir
Line players
 6  Hildur Björnsdóttir	
 18  Hildigunnur Einarsdóttir
 23  Brynja Benediktsdóttir

Back players
LB
 24  Mariam Eradze
 35  Lovisa Thompson
CB
 4  Sara Dögg Hjaltadóttir
 7  Morgan Marie Þorkelsdóttir
 33  Elin Rosa Magnusdóttir
RB
 10  Þórey Ásgeirsdóttir
 25  Thea Imani Sturludóttir

Notable players
 Anna Úrsúla Guðmundsdóttir
 Dagný Skúladóttir
 Dröfn Haraldsdóttir
 Guðný Jenny Ásmundsdóttir
 Hildigunnur Einarsdóttir
 Lovísa Thompson
 Ragnhildur Rósa Guðmundsdóttir
 Sandra Erlingsdóttir
 Þorgerður Anna Atladóttir
 Arna Sif Pálsdóttir

References

External links
Official website

Handball teams in Iceland
Valur (club)
 
Handball clubs established in 1948
1940s establishments in Iceland